Palestine Action is a pro-Palestinian protest network that uses civil disobedience tactics to shut down and disrupt multinational arms dealers. In particular, the group targets UK-based operations that provide weapons used in the Israeli–Palestinian conflict.

Protests
Palestine Action was founded on 30 July 2020 when activists broke into and spray-painted the interior of Elbit Systems' UK headquarters in London.

On 19 May 2021, during the 2021 Israel–Palestine crisis, four members of the group dressed in red boiler suits climbed onto the roof of an Elbit Systems-owned drone factory in Meridian Business Park, Leicester. The occupation lasted six days, and a total of 10 arrests were made for conspiracy to commit criminal damage and aggravated trespass.

The group have staged similar occupations of Elbit Systems sites in Bristol, Oldham in collaboration with Extinction Rebellion and Tamworth in collaboration with Animal Rebellion.

On 10 June 2021, three protestors from the group "stormed, scaled and occupied" an APPH drone factory in Runcorn.  Activists daubed red paint on the exterior, dismantled drone and aircraft machinery and destroyed windows. The next day all three were arrested on suspicion of criminal damage and aggravated trespass.

On 14 June, the fourth anniversary of the Grenfell fire, a similar occupation protest was staged at an Arconic factory in Kitts Green, Birmingham by three protestors. Arconic provided the cladding that allowed the rapid transmission of fire across Grenfell tower, and according to Palestine Action provide "materials for Israel's fighter jets". The occupation ended when two activists were arrested from the roof of the building two days later. One activist was remanded in prison and immediately went on hunger strike. The activist said they would end their strike if any one of four conditions were met: release of Palestine Action protestors; the eviction of Elbit from its London headquarters by property firm LaSalle Investment Management; the closure of all Elbit Systems’ British operations or; release by the government of all correspondence and documents relating to its dealings with Elbit and its subsidiaries.

In April 2022, two Palestine Action protestors chained themselves to the gates of a drone factory of UAV Tactical Systems at Meridian Business Park in Braunstone. Other activists gathered nearby with signs stating "Free Palestine". Three protestors were arrested. A spokesperson for the group said that "Direct action will not cease until all Elbit sites are closed."

References

Non-governmental organizations involved in the Israeli–Palestinian conflict
Palestinian solidarity movement
Direct action